Howard Lasnik (born July 3, 1945) is a distinguished university professor in the department of linguistics at the University of Maryland.

He studied at the Carnegie Institute of Technology (B.S., 1967), Harvard University (M.A., 1969) and the Massachusetts Institute of Technology (Ph.D., 1972). He joined the faculty of the University of Connecticut in 1972, and took up his present post at the University of Maryland in 2002.

Lasnik has been a prominent contributor to the syntax literature within a Chomskyan framework, and is one of only a few linguists to have co-written articles with Noam Chomsky. He describes himself as a "conservative" who often finds himself "trying to resurrect old analyses or maintain current analyses that are being supplanted."

External links
 Homepage

References
Notes

Bibliography

1945 births
Living people
Carnegie Mellon University alumni
Harvard University alumni
Massachusetts Institute of Technology alumni
University of Connecticut faculty
Linguists from the United States
Generative linguistics
Syntacticians
University of Maryland, College Park faculty
Fellows of the Linguistic Society of America